Melbourne tram route 72 is operated by Yarra Trams on the Melbourne tram network from Melbourne University to Camberwell. The 16.8 kilometre route is operated out of Malvern depot with Z and D class trams.

History
Route 72 was first allocated to the line between Camberwell (Burke Road) and the City (Swanston Street) on 1 November 1970. Prior to that, the line to Camberwell was serviced by route 7. The change was at first due to operations of the Camberwell line being shifted from Malvern depot to Camberwell depot. Even though the route was subsequently returned to Malvern in August 1979, the number 72 was kept. Before 1970, Route 72 was a short-working of the Wattle Park line, for trams that terminated at Riversdale instead of Wattle Park. Trams traditionally terminated at the Victoria Street terminus, but following an accident in 1991, trams instead terminated at the Queensberry Street crossover. Due to congestion during peak hours at the crossover, some trams continued north to Melbourne University. Finally on 17 January 1996, a permanent shunt was built at Melbourne University. From then on, route 72 trams were altered run full-time to Melbourne University.

The origins of route 72 lie in separate tram lines. The section of track between Queensberry Street (Stop 4) and Commercial Road (Stop 25) is the oldest section of this route, dating back to the Brighton Road cable tram which opened on 11 October 1888 by the Melbourne Tramway & Omnibus Company. This cable tram line was electrified in stages by the Melbourne & Metropolitan Tramways Board. The section between Domain Interchange (Stop 20) and Commercial Road was electrified on 27 December 1925. The section between Queensberry Street and City Road (near Stop 14) was electrified on the same day. The line between City Road and Domain Interchange was electrified on 24 January 1926. The Prahran & Malvern Tramways Trust constructed the Malvern Road line between St Kilda Road and Gardiner (Stop 50) on 8 April 1915. This line was extended to Camberwell station (Stop 64) on 6 December 1917, and then to Cotham Road on 7 March 1918.

The route was curtailed for 21 months from March 1995 while a bridge was built over the Monash Freeway. In response to the State Government's Melbourne 2030 planning policy, the Public Transport Users Association lobbied to extend route 72 north to Doncaster Road and Ivanhoe station, and south to Caulfield.

Operation
Route 72 is operated out of Malvern depot with Z and D class trams.

Route map

References

External links

072
072
1970 establishments in Australia
Transport in the City of Boroondara
Transport in the City of Stonnington